A general election was held in the United Kingdom on Thursday, 11 June 1987 and all 72 seats in Scotland were contested.

MPs 
List of MPs for constituencies in Scotland (1987–1992)

Results

Votes summary

Incumbents defeated

Outcome 

While the Conservatives under Margaret Thatcher comfortably won a majority across the United Kingdom, the result saw the Conservatives suffer significant losses as their vote share declined significantly in what The Glasgow Herald called "the humiliation of the Tories north of the border." Labour, who as well as gaining seats from the Conservatives also took two from the SNP and one from the SDP, now had more MPs form Scotland than at any other point in the party's history, including holding every seat in Glasgow, while the Conservatives were reduced to their lowest number since the Second World War. Several prominent Scottish Conservative MPs, including Peter Fraser, Sir Alex Fletcher and Michael Ancram lost their seats, while George Younger, then Secretary of State for Defence, only very narrowly held his Ayr constituency after a recount. The Conservatives also had close results in  Edinburgh West, where James Douglas-Hamilton's majority was reduced to 498 votes, and at Stirling where junior minister Michael Forsyth's majority fell from over 5,000 to 948 votes. The SNP's leader Gordon Wilson and the former leader of the SDP Roy Jenkins, also lost their seats to Labour challengers. Labour also took the Western Isles constituency from the SNP following the retirement of former SNP leader Donald Stewart, with the seat seeing an SNP to Labour swing of 19.6%. The SNP partially compensated for their losses by gaining three seats from the Conservatives, while the Conservatives also lost two seats to the Liberals.

In reaction to the poor Conservative performance compared with England, Scottish Secretary, Malcolm Rifkind, said "Of course I am disappointed. We have done well in the south, but not se well in Scotland." He noted that the recession had "bitten deeper" in Scotland than in England and that recovery had been slower. The defeated Sir Alex Fletcher stated that "There is no Tory press in Scotland. The papers up here are rather hostile to the Tory Party".

An editorial in The Glasgow Herald the day after the election argued that the results meant that "the case in favour of devolution is automatically strengthened", while also observing that the "patchy showing" by the SNP showed "that there is no general inclination for separatism".

References 

1987 in Scotland
1980s elections in Scotland
1987
Scotland